The 2016–17 Amkar Perm season was their 13th season in the Russian Premier League, the highest tier of association football in Russia, following promotion during the 2003 season. They will participate in the Russian Premier League and Russian Cup.

Squad

Out on loan

Youth squad

Transfers

Summer

In:

Out:

Winter

In:

Out:

Competitions

Russian Premier League

Results by round

Matches

League table

Russian Cup

Squad statistics

Appearances and goals

|-
|colspan="14"|Players away from the club on loan:
|-
|colspan="14"|Players who appeared for Amkar Perm no longer at the club:

|}

Goal Scorers

Disciplinary Record

References

External links
Official Website

FC Amkar Perm seasons
Amkar Perm